Fartsovka (Russian: фарцовка)  is a slang term for the illegal purchase or resale of imported goods banned in the USSR, which were hard to find and inaccessible to the average Soviet inhabitant. Clothing and accessories were the overwhelming majority of supply and demand for fartsovki. Also popular were audio media (vinyl records, cassette tapes, and reels), cosmetics, household items, and books. Fartsovka items, or the phenomenon itself, was generally called fartsa. The traders were mainly young people (students), as well as persons who, by the nature of their activities, have the opportunity to closely interact with foreigners, such as guides, translators, taxi drivers, and prostitutes.  

The vast majority of buyers in the market for goods sold on the black market (in the 1950s and 1960s) were the so-called "Stilyagi".  Later, in the 1970s and 1980s, everyone who had money and wanted to dress in an original way purchased imported consumer goods or equipment, books, or imported musical records, and resorted to the services of black marketeers. During these years, the sources of fartsovka also changed, and the concept itself acquired a broader meaning. The main occupation of most of those who were called black marketers became buying through acquaintances who had connections or the opportunity to travel abroad, allowing them to acquire scarce goods and foodstuffs.

Etymology
The exact origin of the term "Fartsovka" is uncertain, but one account suggests that it was derived from an archaic word from the Odessa dialect of Russian, "forets" (форец). A "forets" was a man who bought cheap items and sold them at dishonestly expensive prices.

Another possible etymology for the term was the English phrase "for sale", distorted into "forser", referring to the fartsovkas' approach towards foreign, English-speaking tourists.

Description

Fartsovki were mainly young people, as well as people who had the opportunity to closely communicate with foreigners, such as guides, translators, taxi drivers, and prostitutes.

The majority of buyers on the market for the goods in the 1950s–1960s were hipsters. Later, in the 1970s–1980s years all those who had the money and wanted different clothes, cosmetics, equipment, books or music, had to use the services of black marketeers. During these years, the sources of fartsovy also changed, and the concept itself acquired a broader meaning. The main occupation of most of those who were previously called black-marketeers was buying through acquaintances who had connections or the ability to travel abroad.

See also

500 Days
 Perestroika
 Glasnost
 Khozraschyot
 Demokratizatsiya
 Dissolution of the Soviet Union
 Transition economy
Gombeen man
Spiv
Wide boy
Ticket scalping

Links 

 Pavel Romanov, Elena Yarskaya-Smirnova . Fartsa: The underground of the Soviet consumer society
 P. Romanov, M. Suvorova "Pure Fartsa" 
 Mikhail Weller . The legend about the founder of Fartsovka Fima Blyaishits  - the history, essence, mechanism of fartsovka are presented artistically.
 "How the blacksmiths of the 80s died out"
 Baikov V.D. Leningrad Chronicles: from the post-war 50s to the "dashing 90s". M. Karamzin, 2017 .-- 486 p., Ill. - 

Second economy of the Soviet Union
Russian slang